Time Machine for Three Conductors and Orchestra is a two-movement orchestral composition by the American composer Michael Daugherty.  The piece was commissioned by the Pittsburgh Symphony Orchestra and premiered November 24, 2003, with the Pittsburgh Symphony Orchestra led by the conductors Mariss Jansons, Lucas Richman, and Edward Cumming.

Style and composition
The piece has a duration of roughly twenty minutes and is divided into two movements:
Past
Future

To perform Time Machine, a standard symphony orchestra must be divided into three separate ensembles and led by three conductors simultaneously.  Rhythm, tempo, and time signature are frequently juxtaposed between the three ensembles, resulting in often antiphonal and polymetric sounds.  Daugherty described the piece in the score program note, writing:
In a pre-premiere interview about the piece, Daugherty convivially added, "It is not a particularly practical idea. I saw it as a challenge. Part of being new is to look at musical expression and to discover new things. Part of what avant-garde music is all about is doing something you are not supposed to do — forbidden music."

Instrumentation
The work is scored an orchestra comprising for four flutes (fourth doubling piccolo), two oboes, cor anglais, three clarinets (third doubling E-flat clarinet), bass clarinet, four bassoons (fourth doubling contrabassoon), four French horns, four trumpets, three trombones, bass trombone, tuba, timpani, five percussionists, harp, and strings.

Reception
Alex Chilvers of Limelight called Time Machine "an interesting concept" and "dramatic and never dull."  Mark Estren of The Washington Post praised the work as "blar[ing] along just wonderfully, from a sonic point of view, providing an effective contrast between 'Past' and 'Future'."

Discography
A recording of Time Machine was released January 4, 2011, through Naxos Records on a compilation album also featuring Daugherty's other orchestral works Route 66, Ghost Ranch, and Sunset Strip.  To perform the work, the Bournemouth Symphony Orchestra was led by conductors Marin Alsop, Mei-Ann Chen, and Laura Jackson.

See also
List of compositions by Michael Daugherty

References

Compositions by Michael Daugherty
2003 compositions
Compositions for symphony orchestra
21st-century classical music
Music commissioned by the Pittsburgh Symphony Orchestra